Manchester Metrolink is a tram/light rail system in Greater Manchester, England.  The network has 99 stops along  of standard-gauge route, making it the most extensive light rail system in the United Kingdom. Metrolink is owned by the public body Transport for Greater Manchester (TfGM) and operated and maintained under contract by a Keolis/Amey consortium. In 2021/22, 26 million passenger journeys were made on the system.

The network consists of eight lines which radiate from Manchester city centre to termini at Altrincham, Ashton-under-Lyne, Bury, East Didsbury, Eccles, Manchester Airport, Rochdale and Trafford Centre. It runs on a mixture of on-street track shared with other traffic; reserved track sections segregated from other traffic, and converted former railway lines. Metrolink is operated by a fleet of 147 high-floor Bombardier M5000 light rail vehicles. Each service runs to a 12-minute headway; stops with more than one service experience combined headways of 6 minutes or less. At the busiest times some services operate as 'doubles', with two vehicles coupled together.

A light rail system for Greater Manchester emerged from the failure of the 1970s Picc-Vic tunnel scheme to obtain central government funding. A light-rail scheme was proposed in 1982 as the least expensive rail-based transport solution for Manchester city centre and the surrounding Greater Manchester metropolitan area. Metrolink became the United Kingdom's first modern street-running rail system; the 1885-built Blackpool tramway being the only first-generation tram system in the UK that had survived up to Metrolink's creation.

Expansion of Metrolink has been a critical strategy of transport planners in Greater Manchester, who have overseen its development in successive projects, known as Phases 1, 2, 3a, 3b, 2CC and Trafford Park. The Greater Manchester Combined Authority has proposed numerous further expansions of the network, including the addition of tram-train technology to extend Metrolink services onto local heavy-rail lines.

History

Predecessors
Manchester's first tram age began in 1877 with the first horse-drawn trams of Manchester Suburban Tramways Company. Electric traction was introduced in 1901, and the municipal Manchester Corporation Tramways expanded across the city. After World War II, electric trolleybuses and motor buses began to be favoured by local authorities as a cheaper transport alternative, and by 1949 the last Manchester tram line was closed. Trolleybuses were withdrawn from service in 1966.

Origins

Greater Manchester's railway network historically suffered from poor north–south connections because Manchester's main railway stations, Piccadilly and Victoria, were built in the 1840s on peripheral locations outside Manchester city centre. The central commercial district had no rail links, and over the years, several unsuccessful schemes were proposed to connect Manchester's rail termini. In the 1960s, transport design studies were undertaken to address the problems of increasing traffic congestion. Many urban public transport schemes were evaluated for Manchester, including several types of monorail systems and metro-style systems.

While the monorail schemes were all abandoned, a scheme to create a tunnel link gained momentum. The SELNEC Passenger Transport Executive — the body formed in 1969 to improve public transport for Manchester and its surrounding municipalities – promoted the 'Picc-Vic tunnel' project. The project was a proposal to link Piccadilly and Victoria stations via a tunnel under the city centre and enable train services to run across the Manchester conurbation. Greater Manchester County Council (GMC) inherited the project and presented it to the United Kingdom Government in 1974, but the council failed to secure the necessary funding, and the project was abandoned in 1977. The Centreline shuttle bus service provided inter-station links for many years.

The Greater Manchester Passenger Transport Executive (GMPTE), the successor to SELNEC, continued to examine possible rail link solutions. Light rail emerged in the early 1980s as a cost-effective option that could make use of existing railway lines and run through the city centre at street level, eliminating the need for costly tunnelling works. A Rail Study Group, composed of officials from British Rail, GMC and GMPTE formally endorsed the Project Light Rail scheme in 1984. Initial abstract proposals, based on light rail systems in North America and continental Europe, illustrated a draft  network consisting of three lines: Altrincham–/, Bury–/ and –. To promote the scheme, GMPTE held a public proof of concept demonstration in March 1987 using a Docklands Light Railway P86 train on a freight-only line adjacent to Debdale Park. The Project Light Rail proposals were presented to the UK Government for taxpayer funding; following route revisions in 1984 and 1987, Project Light Rail was approved. Because of the central government's constraints on financial support for innovative transport projects, funding was granted by HM Treasury with the strict condition that the system be constructed in phases. Additional taxpayer funding came from the European Regional Development Fund and bank lending.

Construction

Parliamentary authority to proceed with Phase 1 construction was obtained with two Acts of Parliament – the Greater Manchester (Light Rapid Transit System) Act 1988 and Greater Manchester (Light Rapid Transit System) (No. 2) Act 1988.

Phase 1: Bury, Altrincham and Manchester city centre

Beginning in July 1991, the first Phase of Metrolink involved the conversion of two suburban heavy rail lines to light rail operation — the Bury-Victoria line in the north and the Altrincham-Piccadilly line in the south — and the construction of a street-level tramway through the city centre to connect the two. Tracks were laid down along a  route from Victoria station, via Market Street to the G-Mex, with a  branch to Piccadilly station. This route is now known as the First City Crossing (1CC), and it was built with network expansion in mind.

A fleet of 26 AnsaldoBreda T-68 light rail vehicles was procured to operate the  network. Construction was carried out by the GMA Group (a consortium of AMEC, GM Buses, John Mowlem & Company and GEC), costing £145 million (equivalent to £ million in ).

Metrolink was initially scheduled to open in September 1991, but services did not begin until 1992, when the Bury Line opened as far as Victoria on 6 April.  The first street-level trams began running on 27 April between Victoria and G-Mex (now ), the Altrincham line opened on 15 June, and the branch to Piccadilly station opened on 20 July. Metrolink was officially opened by Queen Elizabeth II on 17 July 1992.

Phase 2: Salford Quays, Eccles

The extension cost £160 million (equivalent to £ million in ) and was funded by the GMPTA, the ERDF and private developers. It was constructed 1997–99 by Altram (a consortium of Serco, Ansaldo and John Laing) and six new AnsaldoBreda T-68 A trams were bought to operate services. The line was inaugurated by Prime Minister Tony Blair on 6 December 1999 but temporarily terminated at Broadway as the street running section was completed. The complete line was officially opened by Princess Anne on 9 January 2001.

Phase 3

The Phase 3 extension project, nicknamed the "Big Bang", was promoted by GMPTE and the Association of Greater Manchester Authorities (AGMA) in the early 2000s. The project, costing £489,000,000 (equivalent to £ million in ), would create four new lines: the Oldham and Rochdale Line, the East Manchester Line, the South Manchester Line and the Airport Line. Phase 3 was put in doubt when central government funding was withdrawn due to increasing costs, but after negotiations with the Department for Transport, Phase 3 was split into two parts, 3a and 3b, to secure investment. Phase 3b was delayed after a failed bid to raise funding through the Greater Manchester Transport Innovation Fund and a proposed traffic congestion charge in 2008. GMPTE and AGMA instead funded Phase 3b through a combination of council tax, government grants, Metrolink fares and contributions from the Manchester Airports Group and other bodies. As part of Phase 3, the original blue T-68 trams were also phased out and replaced with a new fleet of Bombardier M5000 trams, which entered service in December 2009.

Phase 3a: Oldham, Rochdale, South and East Manchester

Phase 3b: Ashton-under-Lyne, East Didsbury and Manchester Airport

Phase 3b involved the construction of a new  Airport Line to Manchester Airport, and extending three of the new Phase 3a lines: the East Manchester Line to Ashton-under-Lyne; the South Manchester Line to East Didsbury; and adding street-running routes through Oldham and Rochdale town centres to the Oldham and Rochdale Line. Construction work began in March 2011, and Phase 3b was completed in November 2014 with the opening of the Airport line.

Phase 2CC – Second City Crossing

With increased tram traffic brought about by the expansion of the Metrolink network, it became necessary to build a new route across Manchester City Centre to alleviate congestion and improve capacity.

Known as the Second City Crossing (or 2CC), the project involved laying  of tram tracks from St Peter's Square tram stop via Princess Street, Albert Square, Cross Street and Corporation Street to rejoin the original Metrolink line just before Victoria station. The project also involved re-ordering St Peter's Square and re-siting the Cenotaph to accommodate an enlarged tram interchange and junction. Construction began in 2014, and the 2CC route opened fully in February 2017.

Trafford Park extension
The Transport & Works Act Order for the 3.4 mile (5.4 km) Trafford Park Line was granted in October 2016. Enabling works began in January 2017. The line opened on 22 March 2020.

Current network

Routes and stops

Frequencies

Before the inauguration, GMPTE's original concept was for Metrolink's operator to provide a service every ten minutes from Bury to Piccadilly and Altrincham to Piccadilly from 6 am to midnight, Monday to Saturday. Greater Manchester Metro Limited, the system's original operator, argued for adjustments, citing the need to provide an efficient and commercially viable operation in line with vehicle running times and passenger demand. Due to power limitations, this pattern was modified to a twelve-minute service throughout the day, doubling to a six-minute service in peak periods, resulting in a "ten trams per hour" service pattern on routes running from Altrincham and Bury to Manchester every six minutes. Operators are required to provide this level of service at least 98% of the time or incur a financial penalty charge. This six-minute service pattern has been adopted on the rest of the network as the system has grown. Heavy snowfall during the winter of 2009/10 impaired Metrolink services and the operator was criticised for failing to have cold weather procedures. This prompted a programme to improve the reliability and performance of the system in freezing conditions. Metrolink operated icebreaker-style vehicles at night during snowfall in January 2013 to provide standard services.

In January 2016, Transport for Greater Manchester agreed on a baseline Service Specification to grade bidders seeking to operate the concession from July 2017, once the Second City Crossing is in operation.  In the baseline service pattern, there are no designated 'peak' periods of service operation; instead, there will be an 'enhanced' service operating from start of service to 8 pm Monday to Friday, and to 6 pm Saturday; and a 'core' service running at all other times.  In the 'enhanced' service pattern, trams will run with a 6-minute frequency to Shaw & Oldham, Bury, Ashton, Altrincham, Manchester Airport and East Didsbury; and with a 12-minute frequency to Rochdale, Eccles and MediacityUK.  When the Trafford line opens, services will run to the Trafford Centre with a 12-minute frequency. In the 'core' service pattern, all lines will run with a 12-minute frequency.

Daytime services

The following services run 07:15–19:30 on weekdays and 09:30–18:00 on Saturdays.

Nine services which run every 12 minutes:
   – 
   – 
   – 
  Etihad Campus –  (Withdrawn indefinitely due to COVID 19 pandemic)
   – 
   – 
   – 
   – 
   – 

Thus the combined frequency for some routes is at least every 6 minutes, if not higher.

All-day services

The following services run all day from 06:00 until 23:30 on Mondays to Thursdays, and from 06:00 until 00:30 on Fridays and Saturdays, and from 07:00 – 22:30 on Sundays and bank holidays.

Six services which all run every 12 minutes:
   – 
   –  (via  outside Mon–Sat daytime hours)
   – 
   – 
   – 
   – 

Early morning service

The early morning service operates from 03:00–06:00 Monday to Saturday and 03:00–07:00 on Sundays and bank holidays.

One service which runs every 20 minutes:
   – 

This is mostly to support airport shift workers and people with early flights.

These services were removed in March 2020 due to the COVID-19 pandemic. As of February 2023 there are no plans to reintroduce this service.

Services during COVID-19 pandemic

Due to changing travel patterns as a result of the COVID-19 pandemic, advice is against all but essential travel. Thus Metrolink have temporarily introduced a reduced timetable, with trams running every 20 minutes on the following lines only. In September 2020 with more people returning to work and social activities there is now a 10-minute frequency operating Monday – Friday and at some service at the weekend. The 10 minute frequency has also led to double units being used on most workings: The 6 minute service was reintroduced on 5 July 2021, although temporarily removed in August 2021 due the number of staff having to self isolate. The Altrincham to Bury direct services resumed on Tuesday 31 August with the Shaw to East Didsbury services on Monday 6 September 2021.
   – 
   –  (via )
   – 
   – 
   – 
   –

Rolling stock

Current fleet
, Metrolink operated a fleet of 147 trams.

Trams on Metrolink operate either single units, or coupled together to form double units, which regularly run during peak hours.

Bombardier M5000

In December 2009, Metrolink took delivery of the first Bombardier M5000 tram. Built by Bombardier Transportation and Vossloh Kiepe, the initial eight M5000s were ordered to allow services to be increased. They are part of the Bombardier Flexity Swift range of light rail vehicles and have a design similar to the K5000 vehicle used on the Cologne Stadtbahn.

With the approval of the spur to MediaCityUK, a further four were ordered. To provide rolling stock for the phase 3 extensions and replace the existing fleet, the order was increased successively to 94. In December 2013, a further 10 M5000s were ordered to provide trams for the Trafford Park Line planned to open in 2020, while in the interim supporting a service between MediaCityUK and Manchester city centre and other capacity enhancements. In September 2014, a further 16 were ordered; the final one of which was delivered in October 2016, bringing the fleet up to 120.

In July 2018, a further 27 were ordered to help relieve overcrowding. Delivered from November 2020, the final tram was delivered in October 2022.

Ancillary vehicles
Metrolink has several ancillary vehicles used for maintenance within depots. The "Special Purpose Vehicle", later numbered 1027 with its support wagon 1028, is a bespoke diesel-powered vehicle dating from the networks construction in 1991. It is fitted with a crane, inspection platform, mobile workshop, and capacity for a driver and three passengers. It was designed to assist with vehicle recovery and track and line repairs although to the end of its service life rarely left its base at Queens Road Depot. By January 2023 both 1027 & 1028 had been withdrawn from service for disposal.

In 2020 Metrolink took delivery of a Zephir Crab 2100E, a small battery powered vehicle for use moving trams within the depot. It is based at Queens Road to replace the Special Purpose Vehicle. Trafford depot operates a smaller Zephir Crab 1500E dating from construction of the depot in 2011. A Unimog road-rail vehicle was added to the fleet in mid-2022 to support infrastructure inspection and maintenance activities.

Former fleet
Manchester Metrolink has previously operated the following trams:

T-68/68A

To commence operations, a fleet of 26 T-68 trams manufactured by AnsaldoBreda in Italy was delivered in 1992. To provide extra trams for the Eccles Line, six modified T-68A trams were purchased in 1999. The T-68A vehicles were based on the original T-68s but had modifications replacing destination rollblinds with dot matrix displays, and retractable couplers and covered bogies necessary for the high proportion of on-street running close to motor traffic.

Three of the earlier T-68 fleet were similarly equipped and were known as T-68Ms. Mechanically and electrically, the T-68M vehicles were essentially a T-68 with modifications to its brakes, mirrors, and speed limiters to suit the Eccles line. Initially only these vehicles were permitted to operate the Eccles line but the entire fleet except for 3 (1018, 1019, 1020) were modified between 2008 and 2012 for universal running, under a programme known as the T-68X Universal Running programme.

The newer M5000 trams proved to be considerably more reliable than the T-68/A fleet, which averaged 5,000 miles between breakdowns, while the M5000s averaged 20,000 miles. This led to a decision in 2012 to withdraw the entire fleet from service and replace them with M5000s. The T-68 and T-68As were withdrawn between April 2012 and April 2014.

Tram numbers 1007 and 1023 are owned by the Manchester Transport Museum Society, who run the Heaton Park Tramway, 1007 remains in store at Old Trafford depot while 1023 is at the Crewe Heritage Centre on display. Both will move to Heaton Park upon construction of an extension to the current depot.

San Francisco trams

In 2002, in the lead up to Manchester hosting the Commonwealth Games, a requirement to increase capacity for the event led to Metrolink investigating the purchase of redundant second-hand Boeing LRV vehicles from the Muni Metro system in San Francisco. Two were procured for testing at a cost of £170 each, although transport costs added £15,000 to that figure. The trams, numbered 1226 and 1326, were shipped to the UK in January 2002, with 1326 taken to Queen's Road depot and 1226 sent to a research centre in Derby for safety evaluations. 1326 was hauled by the Special purpose vehicle on a test from Queens Road depot to Eccles and back but suffered from a number of derailments. In the end, the proposal was not taken forward as the vehicles were found to be unsuitable and not cost effective for use in the UK with both later being scrapped.

Infrastructure

Lines

The lines are: the Airport Line (which terminates at Manchester Airport), the Altrincham Line (which terminates in Altrincham), the Bury Line (which terminates in Bury), the East Manchester Line (which terminates in Ashton-under-Lyne), the Eccles Line (which terminates in Eccles), the Oldham and Rochdale Line (which terminates in Rochdale), the South Manchester Line (which terminates in East Didsbury), and the Trafford Park Line (which terminates at the Trafford Centre).

Tram stops

There are 99 tram stops on Metrolink, as of 2022. The first stops on the Bury Line and Altrincham Line, opened in phase one, were formerly railway stations and were changed little from British Rail days, as available funding only allowed minimum upgrades to be made. When the Oldham and Rochdale Line was converted from a railway, however, all of the former railway stations were completely rebuilt.

Metrolink stops are unstaffed. Each contains at least two ticket vending machines (except for Pomona, which only has one). Card readers are installed on all stop platforms for use with contactless pay-as-you-go, the TfGM 'My Get Me There' smart card, and concessionary passes. All card users are required to touch-in at these platform readers before commencing their journey and to touch-out at their final destination. Stops are provided with help/emergency call points to enable passengers to speak to control. Each stop is monitored by CCTV for public safety, and the images are continuously recorded. Route maps and general information are provided on each platform. Shelters and canopies at stops were supplied by JCDecaux, and ticket vending machines by Scheidt & Bachmann.

Power supply
The trams are electrically powered from 750 V DC overhead lines. Between 1992 and 2007, electricity for the Metrolink system was procured by the operator, based on price only. In 2007, GMPTE changed the contractual requirements to ensure that sustainable power would be factored into choosing an energy supplier, and in July 2007, Metrolink became the first light rail network in the UK with electricity supplied entirely from sustainable energy via hydropower. Now, energy for the system is generated by biomass.

Depots

Metrolink has two depots, at Queens Road and Old Trafford: Metrolink House at Queens Road in Cheetham Hill  was the original headquarters of Metrolink. Constructed during Phase 1 alongside the Bury Line, it served jointly as a control centre, HQ, office space, and depot for the storage, maintenance and repair of vehicles. Under the original proposals, Metrolink House was intended to be much larger, with a design which would support network expansion, but this design did not obtain the necessary planning permission from Manchester City Council. Consequently, Metrolink House was scaled down to a  £8,000,000 site with limited capacity, and, in light of Phase 3a network expansion, the second depot in Old Trafford was built in 2011. This second depot, adjacent to the Old Trafford tram stop, occupies the site of a former warehouse and can stable up to 96 vehicles, it also has a washing plant and maintenance workshops. On 7 May 2013 Metrolink completed the transfer of its main operational functions from Queens Road to Old Trafford, meaning its control room – known as the Network Management Centre – is housed jointly with the Customer Services team by its newer depot.

Fares and ticketing

Metrolink fares were initially set by the system's operator, but are now set by the TfGM Committee at levels that cover both the running costs and the cost of borrowing that has part-funded the expansion of the system; Metrolink receives no public subsidy. Fares typically rise each January above the rate of inflation. The fare tariff is based on a division of the network's stops into fare zones. Persons under 16 years of age, persons of pensionable age, and people with disabilities qualify for concessionary fares, some of which are mandatory and others discretionary, as determined by the Greater Manchester Combined Authority. The Greater Manchester Combined Authority permits reduced fares for persons under 16 years of age, and free or reduced fares on Metrolink after  for pensioners. In normal circumstances, tickets cannot be purchased on board Metrolink vehicles and must be purchased from a ticket vending machine before boarding the vehicle.

Fare evasion in 2006 was estimated at 2–6% of all users, and in 2012 at 2.5% of all users. Checking tickets and passes and issuing Standard fares (similar to penalty fare) is the responsibility of Metrolink's Passenger Services Representatives (PSRs), who provide security and assistance on the network; between 1992 and 2008, Greater Manchester Police had a dedicated Metrolink unit responsible for policing the system.

Thorn EMI designed the original ticket vending machines. In 2005 GMPTE announced that rail passengers travelling from within Greater Manchester into Manchester city centre could use the Metrolink service between the then eight City Zone stops for free. Passengers must present a valid rail ticket, correctly dated with Manchester Ctlz as the destination. In 2007 TfGM rolled out new ticket vending machines, designed to accept credit/debit card payments and permit the purchase of multiple tickets in a single transaction. These were replaced in 2009 with touchscreen machines, designed with the Scheidt & Bachmann Ticket XPress system.

In October 2012, TfGM announced it was devising a more straightforward zonal fare system, comparable to London fare zones, and preparing to introduce get me there, the region's new contactless smartcard system, for use on all public transport modes in Greater Manchester, including Metrolink. After years of consultation, a new system using four concentric zones was implemented on 13 January 2019. From 15 July 2019, a new contactless pay-as-you-go service began, allowing passengers to tap in and out on smart readers using their contactless bank cards. Contactless fares were originally capped to no more than the cost of the equivalent daily travelcard. In September 2021 an additional weekly cap was introduced.

Services

Accessibility
Metrolink trams and stops have been designed to be accessible to disabled passengers: each stop has been provided with access ramps or lifts, tactile paving, high visibility handrails, disabled boarding points, and help points on the platforms. The trams have also been designed with large areas available for the provision of wheelchairs and pushchairs.

However, this access was not in the original plans (which were based on tram-side extending steps and low-level platforms in the city centre) and accessibility took four years of concerted campaigning by disabled people in Greater Manchester from 1984 to 1988, and particularly the efforts of Neville Strowger (1939–2015), a disabled person working as the access officer at Manchester City Council, and a founding member of the Greater Manchester Coalition of Disabled People. The campaign was to change the design policy to create full access, including retrofitting access to the legacy train stations on the Bury line and the Altrincham line. An early milestone in the campaign was a large meeting between GMPTE officers and around 70 disabled people at County Hall on 22 November 1984, including a speech from the invited disability rights campaigner Vic Finkelstein. A further key meeting was in May 1987 with over 100 disabled people and elected Councillor Guy Harkin as Chair of GMPTA plus other officials, but the policy in 1987 that was repeated at this meeting was that access would only be possible "if the budget allows." Full access was finally agreed in the summer of 1988, and productive meetings followed with disabled people on the implementation details. This campaigning was researched in detail starting in 2019 and written up in an 8-page pamphlet in February 2020.

Mobility scooters were initially banned from Metrolink. However, in 2014 a scheme was introduced whereby scooters could be allowed on trams, provided they have a permit which can be obtained after an assessment of the scooter's size and manoeuvrability.

Currently the Metrolink operator company consults with a group of disabled people, via TfGM's relationship with the independent Disability Design Reference Group, on any proposed changes to the services or infrastructure.

In August 2022, a trial was launched to allow dogs on trams. During the trial, dogs must be kept on leads.

Bicycle policy 
Metrolink does not allow full-sized bicycles on to trams but does permit the carriage of "fully covered" folding bicycles. The ban on non-folding bicycles was upheld in 2010, despite a campaign by cycling and green groups for the trams to be adapted to allow them. Campaigners against the policy had argued that the ban on bicycles was anomalous, as other large objects such as ironing boards and deckchairs were allowed on the trams under current rules.

Wi-Fi
In July 2013, the Transport for Greater Manchester Committee announced that it planned to enhance the experience of travelling on Metrolink by tapping into Manchester City Council's grant from the UK Urban Broadband Fund and using it to provide Metrolink passengers with free Wi-Fi when on board. The scheme began with a trial on a single tram – number 3054 – connected to the FreeBeeMcr broadband network with the intention of rolling it out across the whole Metrolink network by Spring 2015. It was rolled out fleet wide in March 2015. On board Wi-Fi was later suspended indefinitely in March 2020.

Corporate affairs

Ownership and structure
Manchester Metrolink is owned by TfGM, and is currently operated and maintained by KeolisAmey Metrolink, a joint venture between Keolis and Amey, who were awarded the contract for a period of up to 10 years from 15 July 2017.

Between 1992 and 1997 Metrolink was operated and maintained as a concession by Greater Manchester Metro Limited, and between 1997 and 2007 by Serco. When next tendered, a 10-year contract was awarded to the Stagecoach Group from 15 July 2007. On 1 August 2011, RATP Group bought the balance of the contract from Stagecoach.
In January 2017, the Keolis/Amey consortium was announced as the successful bidder for the operating and maintenance (O&M) contract to run from 15 July 2017. Unsuccessful competing bidders were RATP, National Express and Transdev.

Business trends
The key trends in recent years for Manchester Metrolink are (years ending 31 March):

Activities in the financial year 2020/21 were severely reduced by the impact of the coronavirus pandemic; the shortfall in fare income was funded by a grant from the UK central government's Department for Transport.

Passenger numbers
Detailed passenger journeys since Metrolink commenced operations in 1992 were:

Metrolink revised its method for calculating passenger boardings in 2010/11, meaning figures are not directly comparable with previous years.

A survey in 2012 revealed that 12% of people in Greater Manchester use Metrolink to travel to work, and 8% use the system every day. The system is most commonly used by 21- to 30-year-olds, and was used most markedly by residents of the Metropolitan Borough of Bury — accounting for around a third of their commuter journeys.

Passenger numbers were severely reduced due to the impact of the COVID-19 pandemic, decreasing 76.7% in the year 2020/21. In the year 2021/22, passenger numbers were still significantly below the level achieved before the pandemic.

Passenger satisfaction
A survey in 2012 revealed that passengers who used Metrolink every day for commuting rated service levels as poor and/or unreliable, with those respondents particularly frustrated by delays and disruptions. TfGM recognised that the older vehicles in its fleet – the T68/T68As — were outdated and the cause of much disruption, and agreed to replace them with M5000s by 2014. Among those who used Metrolink less regularly, the system scored far better in the survey. A survey in 2013 by the non-departmental government body Passenger Focus found that of the five major light rail systems in the United Kingdom – Metrolink, Sheffield Supertram, Nottingham Express Transit, Midlands Metro and Blackpool tramway – Metrolink had the lowest overall satisfaction rating in the United Kingdom. Respondents were surveyed on value for money, punctuality, seating availability, tram stops and overall satisfaction. Metrolink was below average on all criteria, and 47% believed Metrolink was value for money compared to a national average of 60%.

Subsequent surveys have shown increases in passenger satisfaction. A further survey in late 2015 by watchdog Transport Focus, found that satisfaction levels had increased; 89% of passengers surveyed said they were either ‘very’ or ‘fairly’ satisfied with their overall journey, up from 83% in 2013, but still below the national average of 92%. It also found that 58% felt the service was value for money. The national average rating for value for money on all tram networks was 69%. The follow up survey in 2016 found further improvements, with 90% of respondents reporting they were either ‘very’ or ‘fairly’ satisfied with their overall journey, compared to the national average of 93%. 62% now felt the service was value for money, against a national average still of 69%, which although improved was still the lowest ranking of the six systems covered by the survey.

Corporate identity

The standard corporate identity across the Metrolink system uses a pale yellow and metallic silver colour scheme, with a logotype that consists of a diamond motif formed from a pattern of repeating circles and the Metrolink name. The logo, signage and publicity use the Pantograph sans regular typeface. Tram livery features yellow at the vehicle ends with grey sides and black doors, and a pattern of circles.

The corporate identity was created in October 2008 by Hemisphere Design & Marketing Consultants of Manchester, in collaboration with designer Peter Saville and the transport design agency Design Triangle. The Pantograph typeface was specially commissioned from the Dalton Maag type foundry. The design standard was applied to the Metrolink network when the new M5000 trams were introduced to the network. Hemisphere chose yellow for its high visibility and to reflect Greater Manchester's culture of confidence and optimism.

When the Metrolink network first came into operation in 1992, it used a system-wide colour scheme and vehicle livery of aquamarine, black and grey, along with a stylised "M" monogram placed at an angle within a circle. This branding, along with the Metrolink brand name, was devised by Fitch RS and Design Triangle, and first revealed at a press launch in June 1988. Before this, during the planning stage, the system was known as "Light Rapid Transit" (LRT)  and promotional material used an orange and brown identity used by Greater Manchester Transport and GM Buses.

Public relations
Transport planners in Greater Manchester describe Metrolink as both "an icon of Greater Manchester", and "an integral part of the landscape in Greater Manchester". The Guardian describes Metrolink as "Manchester's efficient and much-loved tram system". Under the ownership of the Guardian Media Group, the Manchester Evening News spearheaded the Get Our Metrolink Back on Track campaign in 2004–05. Under Trinity Mirror ownership, the Manchester Evening News used the Freedom of Information Act 2000 to reveal that Metrolink received over 10,000 complaints between May 2011 and May 2012.

Metrolink has had close connections with popular culture in Manchester and has taken advantage of the city's strong associations with football culture. Metrolink has been a "Football Development Partner" with the Manchester Football Association since August 2010, meaning it is the association's Official Travel Partner and supports grassroots association football in Greater Manchester by selecting a "Team of the Month".  In 2013, then Manchester City manager Roberto Mancini and players Joe Hart, Vincent Kompany and James Milner recorded special stop announcements to be used on Metrolink's East Manchester Line on dates when Manchester City play at home at the City of Manchester Stadium (served by the Etihad Campus tram stop). The announcements were first used on 17 February 2013, for Manchester City's FA Cup Fifth Round tie against Leeds United

Metrolink is a sponsor of the annual Manchester Food and Drink Festival.

Metrolink has also featured in television drama. On 6 December 2010, the soap opera Coronation Street featured a storyline with an explosion which caused a crash on the Metrolink system at Weatherfield. The episode was written to celebrate the soap opera's 50th anniversary. Although a fictitious event, at least six calls were made to GMPTE asking if services had been affected.

Future developments

Many speculative expansion proposals exist for new lines and stops, including the addition of tram-train technology.

Pathfinder North
As part of efforts to introduce tram-trains — vehicles that can operate on both light and heavy rail networks — the Greater Manchester Combined Authority (GMCA) proposed three options for initial pathfinder schemes to test the application in Greater Manchester. One of these schemes, Pathfinder North, was submitted for funding as part of the government's City Region Sustainable Transport Settlement (CRSTS) fund. Pathfinder North proposes a new tram-train service from Oldham on Metrolink's Oldham & Rochdale line, connecting to the local heavy rail network at Rochdale railway station, and continuing on to Heywood and Bury on an existing railway no longer in regular passenger use. In July 2022 the GMCA received confirmation of initial funding to develop the pathfinder, including the purchase of up to seven new tram-train vehicles to run the service.

HS2 integration
As part of developments related to bringing High Speed 2 and Northern Powerhouse Rail to Manchester, High Speed Two Limited has proposed the present two-platform Piccadilly Metrolink stop at ground-level below the existing station platforms be relocated. A new larger four-platform stop located underground below the Manchester Piccadilly High Speed station is planned to replace it. Provision for a second ground-level Metrolink stop at the eastern end of the high speed station to service future Metrolink extensions, to be called Piccadilly Central, also forms part of the plans. At the proposed Manchester Airport High Speed station provision for a new Metrolink stop — potentially serving an extension from the existing Airport line — is also envisaged.

See also

 List of tram and light-rail transit systems
 Manchester Corporation Tramways
 Transport in Manchester
 List of town tramway systems in England
 List of town tramway systems in the United Kingdom

Notes

References

Bibliography

 
 
 
 
 
 
 
 
 
 
 
 
 
 
 Worthington, Barry (2014) The Metrolink Companion. Sigma Leisure.

External links

 
 Official route map
 Track plan of Manchester Metrolink
 www.lrta.org/manchester, a historical account of Metrolink from the Light Rail Transit Association

 
Electric railways in the United Kingdom
Light rail in the United Kingdom
Railway lines opened in 1992
Keolis
Stagecoach Group
Tram transport in England
1992 establishments in England
750 V DC railway electrification